Steinar Opstad (born 28 June 1971 in Stokke) is a Norwegian poet. He made his literary debut in 1996 with the poetry collection Tavler og bud, which earned him Tarjei Vesaas' debutantpris.

He was awarded the Aschehoug Prize in 2003 and the Herman Wildenvey Poetry Award in 2015.

References

1971 births
Living people
People from Stokke
20th-century Norwegian poets
Norwegian male poets
20th-century Norwegian male writers